2the Max, officially known as 2the Max Asia Pacific Limited, is a Hong Kong computer hardware company. Founded in 1984, the company was formerly known as JDR Digital Technologies Limited.  Its products include motherboards, display cards, power supplies, peripherals and surveillance devices. Its products are marketed in Europe, United States, Australia, South Korea, China, Japan and Hong Kong.

Products
Most products carry the 2the Max brand. The company is best known for motherboards and power supplies. Some power supplies are traded under a different brand, MaxPower, and Maxtron. These power supplies have been recommended for AMD processors.

Awards
The company has been awarded by ACCA Hong Kong for its good accounting management and gained Innobrand Award 2006 from Junior Chamber International and Hong Kong Brand Development Council. Its computer products and services have also been accredited with the Hong Kong Quality Assurance Association ISO9001:2000 and the "Q-Mark Quality Service" of the Hong Kong Federation of Industries.

Notes

External links

 

Computer companies of Hong Kong
Graphics hardware companies
Motherboard companies
Computer companies established in 1984
1984 establishments in Hong Kong
Hong Kong brands